Björn-Olaf Christen (born April 5, 1980) is a Swiss former professional ice hockey forward who played in Switzerland's National League A (NLA).

Playing career
Christen began his career as a hockey player in the youth team of SC Bern. In the 1996–97 season he made his senior debut in the National League A, and finished his rookie year as the Swiss champions with Bern. After five years, Christen left Bern in 2001 and moved on to their league rivals HC Davos . With Davos, he won the Spengler Cup in 2001 and 2004, and in 2002 and 2005, the Swiss Championship. In the summer of 2006, Christen moved to EV Zug. He played for them until his retirement at the end of the 2014–15 season to work in the insurance industry.

International play
Christen represented Swiss national team at the Under-18 European Junior Championships in 1997 and 1998, as well as the Under-20 Junior World Championships in 1997, 1998, 1999 and 2000 in part. Furthermore, he was in the squad of Switzerland at the World Championships in 2002, 2003 and 2010, and the 2002 Winter Olympics in Salt Lake City .

Career statistics

Regular season and playoffs

International

References

External links

1980 births
Living people
Ice hockey people from Bern
HC Davos players
Ice hockey players at the 2002 Winter Olympics
Olympic ice hockey players of Switzerland
SC Bern players
Swiss ice hockey right wingers
EV Zug players